"House Is Not a Home" is a song recorded and written by Canadian singer Deborah Cox. Released as a single on September 13, 2005, the track became her ninth number one hit on Billboard's Dance Club Songs chart.

Track listings

Charts

Weekly charts

Year-end charts

References

2005 songs
2005 singles
Deborah Cox songs
Dance-pop songs